Texoma is an interstate region in the United States, split between Oklahoma and Texas. The name is a portmanteau of Texas and Oklahoma. Businesses use the term in their names to describe their intended service area. This includes 8 counties with a population estimate of 319,455.

Definition
Texoma is usually defined as the area on either side of the state border along the Red River valley, in particular the area around Lake Texoma. The surrounding area is alternatively referred to as Texomaland.
The Wichita Falls–Lawton and Paris–Hugo areas are often included in Texoma or Texomaland due to their proximity to the Red River and the Texas/Oklahoma border.

Texoma mainly comprises the area and cities surrounding Lake Texoma, which includes eight counties. Much of the population is concentrated in the Sherman–Denison Metropolitan Statistical Area and three Micropolitan Statistical Areas. The area around Bonham is also populous.

Most of the region is also part of the Dallas–Fort Worth Combined Statistical Area.

A portion of Texoma south of Lake Texoma has been designated an American Viticultural Area, the Texoma AVA. The Texas part of Texoma is served by the Texoma Council of Governments.

Notable cities

Other cities and towns

 in Oklahoma
 Achille, Oklahoma
 Altus, Oklahoma
 Ardmore, Oklahoma
 Armstrong, Oklahoma
 Bennington, Oklahoma
 Bromide, Oklahoma
 Bokchito, Oklahoma
 Caddo, Oklahoma
 Calera, Oklahoma
 Colbert, Oklahoma
 Dickson, Oklahoma
 Duncan, Oklahoma
 Gene Autry, Oklahoma
 Healdton, Oklahoma
 Hugo, Oklahoma
 Hendrix, Oklahoma
 Kemp, Oklahoma
 Kenefic, Oklahoma
 Kingston, Oklahoma
 Lawton, Oklahoma
 Leon, Oklahoma
 Lone Grove, Oklahoma
 Marietta, Oklahoma
 Madill, Oklahoma
 Mannsville, Oklahoma
 Mead, Oklahoma
 Milburn, Oklahoma
 Mill Creek, Oklahoma
 New Woodville, Oklahoma
 Oakland, Oklahoma
 Ratliff City, Oklahoma
 Ravia, Oklahoma
 Silo, Oklahoma
 Soper, Oklahoma
 Springer, Oklahoma
 Tatums, Oklahoma
 Thackerville, Oklahoma
 Tishomingo, Oklahoma
 Wapanucka, Oklahoma
 Wilson, Oklahoma
 in Texas
 Archer City, Texas
 Bailey, Texas
 Bells, Texas
 Bowie, Texas
 Burkburnett, Texas
 Callisburg, Texas
 Childress, Texas
 Collinsville, Texas
 Crowell, Texas
 Decatur, Texas
 Dodd City, Texas
 Dorchester, Texas
 Ector, Texas
 Electra, Texas
 Forestburg, Texas
 Gunter, Texas
 Gainesville, Texas
 Honey Grove, Texas
 Howe, Texas
 Henrietta, Texas
 Jacksboro, Texas
 Ladonia, Texas
 Leonard, Texas
 Lindsay, Texas
 Montague, Texas
 Muenster, Texas
 Nocona, Texas
 Oak Ridge, Texas
 Paris, Texas
 Pecan Gap, Texas
 Pottsboro, Texas
 Quanah, Texas
 Ravenna, Texas
 Sadler, Texas
 Savoy, Texas
 Scotland, Texas
 Seymour, Texas
 Sherman, Texas
 Southmayd, Texas
 Sunset, Texas
 Tioga, Texas
 Tom Bean, Texas
 Trenton, Texas
 Valley View, Texas
 Van Alstyne, Texas
 Vernon, Texas
 Windom, Texas
 Windthorst, Texas
 Whitesboro, Texas 
 Whitewright, Texas
 Wichita Falls, Texas

Counties and statistical areas

The Texoma region consists of eight counties, five of which are in Oklahoma and three of which are in Texas.

in Oklahoma
 Bryan County, Oklahoma
 Carter County, Oklahoma
 Johnston County, Oklahoma
 Love County, Oklahoma
 Marshall County, Oklahoma
in Texas
 Cooke County, Texas
 Fannin County, Texas
 Grayson County, Texas
 
 

Some of the counties are included in Texoma's one metropolitan area and three micropolitan areas. In each case, the metro- or micropolitan area corresponds to a single county.
 Ardmore USA, covering Carter County.
 Durant USA, covering Bryan County.
 Gainesville USA, covering Cooke County.
 Sherman–Denison MSA, covering Grayson County.

See also

 Big Pasture
 Choctaw Nation of Oklahoma, which has its headquarters in Durant, Oklahoma
 East Texas
 Eisenhower State Park 
 Greer County, Texas, now defunct county and site of a 19th-century state boundary dispute
 Choctaw (Kiamichi) Country and Little Dixie, often considered interchangeable
 North Texas
 Northeast Texas
 Piney Woods
 South Central Oklahoma
 Southwestern Oklahoma
 Texoma Council of Governments
 Tishomingo National Wildlife Refuge
 Washita River

References

External links 
 

Regions of Oklahoma
Regions of Texas